Malá Hradná is a village and municipality in Bánovce nad Bebravou District in the Trenčín Region of north-western Slovakia.

History
In historical records the village was first mentioned in 1329.

Geography
The municipality lies at an altitude of 290 metres and covers an area of 7.910 km2. It has a population of about 387 people.

External links
https://web.archive.org/web/20071217080336/http://www.statistics.sk/mosmis/eng/run.html
http://www.farnostmalahradna.tym.sk

Villages and municipalities in Bánovce nad Bebravou District